Afonso Álvares (also spelled Affonso Álvares) was the Master of Works for the Portuguese king, Sebastian of Portugal, and he designed, amongst other structures, the Monastery of São Bento in Lisbon in 1571, which was lost in the 1755 Lisbon earthquake, and is now partially the site of the Portuguese Parliament.  He also designed the Fort of Santiago do Outão in 1572.

Sources
O Recreio Nº 2, Lisbon Imprensa Nacional, February 1839, by Luiz Duarte Villela da Silva

Portuguese architects
16th-century Portuguese people
Portuguese engineers
Year of death missing